Seocho District is one of the 25 gu (local government districts) which make up the city of Seoul, South Korea. Seocho is considered a part of Gangnam region, along with the Gangnam and Songpa districts of Seoul. As of 2022, Seocho District ranks as the richest neighborhood in South Korea and among the most expensive areas in Seoul with an average sales price of 47.75 million South Korean won per 3.3 square meters. South Korea's rich are concentrated in the three Gangnam districts including Seocho, known as Gangnam School District Eight(강남 8학군).

Seocho District is served by the Seoul Subway Line 2, Line 3, Line 4, Line 7, Bundang Line,  Line 9, and Shinbundang Line. South Korea's longest highway, Gyeongbu Expressway, ends here. The most crowded area in Korea, Gangnam-daero Gangnam Station is located in Seocho District and half of this place's administration is managed by this district.

Administration 

In South Korea, there are two types of dong or neighborhoods, one of which is called Beopjeong-dong (법정동 ) denoting "dong designated by law". The other is called Haengjeong-dong (행정동 ) referring to "dong assigned for administrative purpose". Beopjeong-dong has a long history, tradition or convention of each place, while as a population of residents in beopjeong-dong increases or decreases, the administration in charge divides one dong to several haengjeong-dong or integrates several beopjeong-dong to one haengjeong-dong such as the following example. Wonji-dong is a beopjeong-dong of Seocho District but is administered by the Yangjae 2-dong office. Seocho 1-dong is one of hangjeong-dongs of Seocho-dong. The below are beopjeong-dong.

Neighborhood
 Seocho-dong (Seocho 1~4 dong)(서초동 )
 Jamwon-dong (잠원동 )
 Banpo-dong (Banpo Bon (Basically 0)~4 dong)(반포동 )
 Bangbae-dong (Bangbae Bon (Basically 0)~4 dong) (방배동 )
 Yangjae-dong (Yangjae 1~2 dong (양재동 )
 Umyeon-dong (우면동 )
 Wonji-dong (원지동 )
 Naegok-dong (내곡동 )
 Yeomgok-dong (염곡동 )
 Sinwon-dong (신원동 )

Characteristics 
The area is home to the Supreme Court and the Supreme Prosecutors' Office. Seocho Samsung Town in Seocho-dong, near Gangnam Station, is the headquarters of several corporations of the Samsung Group including Samsung Electronics. Also in DaeRyung Scecho Tower is the headquarters of South Korean skincare and cosmetics manufacturer Skin Food.

The infamous Sampoong Department Store collapse of 1995 happened in the district.

K-pop label Starship Entertainment (a Kakao Entertainment company) is also located in the area, as well as the electronics and music company Dreamus (a subsidiary of SK Telecom).

Seorae Village in Banpo-dong is a small French enclave, with a large concentration of French residents and European-style restaurants, dessert cafes, as well as wineries and cafes standing along its main street.

Seoul Art Center is also located in Seocho District. It is the place where fireworks take place at the start of a new year.

Geography 
Umyeonsan (mountain)
Guryongsan (mountain)
Cheonggyesan (mountain)
Yangjaecheon (stream)

Attractions 
Supreme Court of Korea
National Library of Korea
Seoul Art Center
National Gugak Center (The National Center for Korean Traditional Performing Arts)
Citizen Park
Heonilleung (Royal Tombs of the Joseon Dynasty)

Transportation

Railroad 
Seoul Metro
Seoul Subway Line 2 Circle Line
(Gangnam-gu) ← Seoul National Univ. of Education – Seocho – Bangbae → (Dongjak-gu)
Seoul Subway Line 3
(Gangnam-gu) ← Jamwon – Express Bus Terminal – Seoul National Univ. of Education – Nambu Bus Terminal – Yangjae (Seocho-gu Office) → (Gangnam-gu)
Seoul Metropolitan Rapid Transit Corporation
Seoul Subway Line 7
(Gangnam-gu) ← Banpo – Express Bus Terminal – Naebang → (Dongjak-gu)
Seoul Metro Line 9 Corporation
Seoul Subway Line 9
(Dongjak-gu) ← Gubanpo – Sinbanpo – Express Bus Terminal – Sapyeong → (Gangnam-gu)
Shinbundang Railroad Company
Shinbundang Line
Gangnam – Yangjae – Yangjae Citizen's Forest (Maeheon) – Cheonggyesan → (Bundang-gu)

Education 

Torch Trinity Graduate University is located in Yangjae-dong, Seocho District.

International schools in the district:
French School of Seoul
Dulwich College Seoul
Rainbow International School

Sister cities

International 
 Suginami, Tokyo, Japan
 Hongkou District, Shanghai, China
 Laoshan District, Qingdao, China
 Çankaya District, Ankara, Turkey
 Perth, Western Australia, Perth, Australia
 Irvine, California, United States
 Cuauhtémoc, Mexico City, Mexico

Domestic 

 Cheongyang
 Haenam
 Hoengseong
 Hwacheon
 Icheon
 Jecheon
 Nam District, Ulsan
 Namwon
 Nonsan
 Sancheong
 Seocheon
 Taean
 Yesan

Notable people from Seocho District 
Lee Da-in (Hangul: 이다인),  South Korean actress
Namjoo (Real Name: Kim Nam-joo, Hangul: 김남주), South Korean singer, dancer, actress,  and K-pop idol, member of K-pop girlgroup Apink
Youngjae (Real Name: Yoo Young-jae, Hangul: 유영재), South Korean singer, actor and K-pop idol, former member of K-pop boygroup B.A.P
Eunbin (Real Name: Kwon Eun-bin, Hangul: 권은빈), South Korean singer, rapper, dancer, actress, model and K-pop idol, member of K-pop girlgroup CLC
Koo Jung Mo (Hangul:구정모) South Korean singer, dancer, and K-pop idol, member of K-pop boygroup Cravity
Park Soobin (Hangul :박수빈) South Korean singer, dancer, k-pop idol, member of k-pop girlgroup WJSN

See also 

Gangnam District
Yongsan District
Gwanak District
Dongjak District
Geography of South Korea

References

External links 

Seocho-gu website
Seocho-gu website 

 
Districts of Seoul